The Airborne Museum (Musée Airborne) is a French museum dedicated to the memory of paratroopers of the 82nd and 101st Airborne Divisions of the United States Army who parachuted into Normandy on the night of June 5–6, 1944. The museum is located in Sainte-Mère-Église.

History
The museum was chartered under a 1901 law, and opened in 1964 with the help of donations from both residents and veterans. The Museum is located in Sainte-Mère-Église, in the La Manche region of Normandy, close to the beaches used for the Normandy landings. Sainte-Mère-Église became famous because of paratrooper John Steele whose parachute snagged on the belfry of the church on June 6, 1944, leaving him suspended in the air. The aim of the museum is to honor the American airborne forces troops of the 82nd and 101st Divisions.

The museum
In 1964, to honor the liberators' memory, Dr Jean Masselin (the mayor of Sainte-Mère-Église), General Matthew Ridgway (Commanding General of the 82nd in 1944) and General James M. Gavin inaugurated the museum on the 20th anniversary of D-Day.

The WACO building, shaped like a large parachute shroud, contains an authentic Waco CG-4 glider, the only example in France. The glider is displayed with dummies representing soldiers getting ready for their flight. These gliders played a key role in transporting more than 4,000 troops as well as vehicles, ammunition and other military equipment, and rations for the soldiers. The museum also contains a wide variety of antique items from that era. This building is located on the same spot as the house which caught fire on the night of June 5, 1944, as shown in the movie The Longest Day.
For the 20th anniversary of the Airborne Museum, General James M. Gavin, who led the 82nd Airborne Division during World War II, attended the ceremonies.

In 1983, in the presence of Bob Murphy (who had served as a pathfinder in the 82nd Airborne Division), the inauguration of a second parachute-shaped building, which houses a Douglas C-47 Skytrain aircraft, took place. This aircraft was involved in airdrop operations on Sainte-Mère-Église on the night of June 5–6, 1944 and in the missions that followed. This building allows the public to "assist" in the preparations for the biggest military operation of the War in England, June 5, 1944, at the bottom of a real C-47. They can observe a diorama of the different recruits from the war with General Eisenhower before D-Day and the Battle of Normandy. The public can also view a film entitled Combat pour la Liberté (Fight for Freedom) that describes life during the German occupation and the liberation of Sainte-Mère-Église and the Cotentin Peninsula.

For the 70th anniversary of D-Day, a third building named "Operation Neptune" opened its doors to the public. Operation Neptune was the first assault phase of Operation Overlord (the code name for the Battle of Normandy). The building was inaugurated in the presence of veterans of World War II. The visitor is first invited to board a C-47 Skytrain in England on June 5, 1944. Then the Battle of Sainte-Mère-Église unfolds including fighting in the marshes and for the bridges before the battle of the hedgerows. The tour ends in a hall with more evocative exhibits.

In May 2015, work was begun on a fourth building, the Franco-American Ronald Reagan Conference Center, to be annexed to the Operation Neptune building and due to open the following year for use in holding temporary exhibitions, lectures, seminars and featuring a large cinema auditorium.

Collections
The museum holds more than 10,000 items, including the CG-4 glider and the C-47 Skytrain, there is equipment used by generals James Gavin, Matthew Ridgway, J. Lawton Collins and John Steele’s military decorations. The items on exhibit from World War II were used by paratroopers who jumped into Sainte-Mère-Église during the Battle of Normandy. The museum contains mostly American equipment, but there are some replicas of German military equipment from the period. There are at least a hundred uniformed dummies used to model uniforms and equipment of the period.

Gallery

External links
 Official site of the Musée Airborne
 The Airborne Museum on Tripadvisor

1964 establishments in France
Aerospace museums in France
Museums established in 1964
Museums in Manche
Operation Overlord museums in France
World War II memorials in France